Barbara Rook "Babs" Snyder is an American academic and president of the Association of American Universities. She is the former president of Case Western Reserve University. A legal scholar, Snyder was the first woman to serve as the Case Western's president.  Earlier in her career, she served as provost of Ohio State University.

Biography
Barbara Snyder earned a bachelor's degree in sociology from Ohio State University and a Juris Doctor degree from the University of Chicago. Before Snyder became president of CWRU in July 2007, she was formerly the executive vice president and provost of Ohio State University. During Snyder's tenure as the university president, CWRU has overcome a $20 million budget deficit, increased fundraising by nearly $60 million, and increased research dollars by more than $15 million.

Following the announcement that Gordon Gee would retire as President of the Ohio State University effective July 1, 2013, speculation arose that Snyder, the former Provost and Executive Vice President of Ohio State, could succeed Gee. In response, Snyder said, "I am proud to be president of Case Western Reserve and intend to continue in this role for many years to come."

In 2011, Cleveland.com reported Barbara R. Snyder's total compensation for the year of 2009 was $778,874.

References

External links
 Office of the President: Case Western Reserve University

1955 births
Living people
Ohio State University College of Arts and Sciences alumni
Presidents of the Association of American Universities
Presidents of Case Western Reserve University
University of Chicago Law School alumni
Women heads of universities and colleges